Hu Zhuowei (born 1 June 1983) is a Chinese former footballer.

Career statistics

Club

Notes

References

1983 births
Living people
Chinese footballers
Association football midfielders
China League One players
Chinese Super League players
Wuhan F.C. players
Jiangsu F.C. players